Aridaeus thoracicus, the tiger longicorn, is a common beetle found in Australia. An attractively marked insect with orange and black patterns, the femur of each leg is swollen in the middle. Orange hairs may be noticed on the legs and thorax. It was described by Anglo-Irish naturalist Edward Donovan in 1805.

In the warmer months, adults are seen on flowering plants, feeding on the pollen and nectar, particularly those in the myrtle family. Larvae feed on dead wood of a variety of trees.

References

External links 

Heteropsini
Insects of Australia
Beetles described in 1805